Jerk of All Trades is a studio album by New York City punk rock band Lunachicks. It was released in 1995 by Go-Kart Records and was produced by Ray Martin.

Critical reception
Entertainment Weekly called Jerk of All Trades "an album of punkoid riffs and comic, melodic choruses." Imbeciles at Trouser Press wrote: "Inoffensive songs of varying seriousness about pets, dolls, adolescent pranks and reproductive rights ... give the album a conceptual variety thoroughly blunted by the stultifying sameness of the music, a relentless barrage that furiously digs itself down a boring hole." The Sun Sentinel wrote that "roaring guitars and screaming vocals make for a noisy full-length disc, but it's fun in an infantile way." The Deseret News deemed the album "filled with image-altering guitars and hyper-intense arrangements."

The A.V. Club called the title track "arguably Lunachicks’ greatest song."

Track listing

For track 11, "Jerk of All Trades," trumpet is played by Tommy Kennedy.

References

External links
"Light as a Feather" video
"Edgar" video

Lunachicks albums
1995 albums
Go-Kart Records albums